Krzysztof Świerkosz (born 1966 in Wrocław) is a Polish poet and literary critic. Some of his works appeared in Monographs  and Parnas Bis. Słownik literatury polskiej urodzonej po 1960 roku.

Works 

 Posokowy epos (1986)
 Dwoje nieznajomych w nadfioletowej twierdzy życia (1990)
 Obieżyświat (2009)

References 

1966 births
Living people
Polish male poets
Polish literary critics
20th-century Polish poets
21st-century Polish poets
Writers from Wrocław